The sabrewings are relatively large Neotropical hummingbirds that form the genus Campylopterus. They are species of the understory and edges of forests, mostly in mountains, and often near streams. The female Sabrewing lays its two white eggs in a relatively large cup nest on a low horizontal branch, usually over a stream.

The sabrewings are very large for hummingbirds, typically 12–15 cm long. The black bill is strong and slightly decurved. The shafts of the male's two outermost primary flight feathers are thickened, flattened and bent at an angle to give the distinctive feature which gives the sabrewings their English and scientific names (Greek καμπυλος  kampylos, "bent", and  πτερον pteron, "wing").

In some species, the male and female plumage is similar, in others, such as the violet sabrewing, the sexes look completely different. In several species, the three outer pairs of the tail feathers are broadly tipped white.

The food of sabrewings is nectar, taken mainly from undergrowth flowers such as Heliconia and bananas.

Taxonomy
The genus Campylopterus was erected by the English naturalist William Swainson in 1827. The type species was subsequently designated as the grey-breasted sabrewing. The generic name combines the Ancient Greek kampulos meaning "curved" or "bent" and -pteros meaning "-winged".

The sombre hummingbird and swallow-tailed hummingbird, formerly classified in Campylopterus, have been reclassified by most authorities into their own monotypic genera Aphantochroa and Eupetomena.

The genus contains 10 species:

References